The Taolaizhao–Shulan railway, named the Taoshu Railway, is a  single-track railway line in Northeast China between Taolaizhao and Shulan. At Taolaizhao it connects to the Jingha Railway, and at Shulan it connects to the Labin Railway and the Jishu Railway.

History
The Taolaizhao–Yushu section of the line was originally built in 1943 by the Manchukuo National Railway as the Taoyu Line (Tōyu Line in Japanese). It was renamed Taoyu Railway by China Railway, and in 2009 it was extended from Yushu to Shulan to connect with the Labin Railway and the Jishu Railway. It received its current name at that time.

Route

References

Railway lines in China
Rail transport in Jilin
Railway lines in Manchukuo
Railway lines opened in 1943